Pseudostigma is a genus of damselflies in the family Pseudostigmatidae. There are at least two described species in Pseudostigma.

Species
These two species belong to the genus Pseudostigma:
 Pseudostigma aberrans Selys, 1860
 Pseudostigma accedens Selys, 1860

References

Further reading

 
 
 
 
 
 
 
 

Damselflies